Onoprienko is a Ukrainian surname.

Notable people
Notable people who have this surname include:
 Alexander Onoprienko, Russian Major-General
 Anatoly Onoprienko (1959-2013), prolific Ukrainian serial killer and mass murderer
 Ekaterina Onoprienko, Russian winner of several Olympic medals
 Glen Onoprienko, Queensland state candidate
 Igor Onoprienko, Ukrainian mixed martial artist
 Nikolai Nikolayevich Onoprienko (1911-1979), Soviet Army Colonel of World War II and Hero of the Soviet Union
 Nikolai Markovich Onoprienko, Russian Guard Senior Lieutenant
 Oleksandr Onoprienko, Ukrainian governor 
 Philip Petrovich Onoprienko, Soviet colonel decorated in the Order of the Red Star
 Yuri Onoprienko, Russian chairman of the Legislative Duma of Khabarovsk Krai
Viktoriia Onopriienko, Ukrainian rhythmic gymnast
 Zinaida Onoprienko, Ukrainian race walker

See also
 

Ukrainian-language surnames